Peculiar is an album by the New York City ska band The Slackers. It was released on Hellcat Records in 2006.

Track listing
 "86 the Mayo" (Ruggiero)  – 4:23
 "Peculiar" (Ruggiero)  – 4:08
 "Propaganda" (Ruggiero/Babajian/Geard)  – 4:31
 "Crazy" (Ruggiero/The Slackers)  – 3:31
 "Set the Girl Free" (Ruggiero)  – 2:38
 "In Walked Capo" (Pine)  – 3:21
 "I'd Rather Die Happy" (Ruggiero)  – 2:59
 "What Went Wrong" (Pine)  – 3:55
 "Keep It Simple" (Hillyard/Ruggiero)  – 3:05
 "International War Criminal" (Ruggiero)  – 3:57
 "Sauron" (Hillyard)  – 3:46
 "Rider" (Ruggiero)  – 4:02
 "I Shall Be Released" (B. Dylan)  – 4:20

Personnel

The Slackers' players
 Ara Babajian – drums
 Marcus Geard – bass, stick guitar, backing vocals
 Dave Hillyard – saxophone
 Jay Nugent – guitar
 Glen Pine – trombone, vocals
 Vic Ruggiero – organ, piano, guitar, vocals, etc.

Additional players
 Marc Lyn – backing vocals on 3, 5, 6, 12, 13
 Alex Desert – backing vocals on 1, 5
 Larry McDonald – percussion on 12, 13
 Sidney Mills – organ on 13
 T.J. Scanlon – guitar on 3, 10, 12, 13
 Susan Walls – trumpet on 2, 8

References

2006 albums
The Slackers albums